Alexandra Panova and Laura Siegemund were the defending champions, but they chose not to defend their title.

Shuko Aoyama and Ena Shibahara won the title, defeating Kirsten Flipkens and Bethanie Mattek-Sands in the final, 6–2, 6–1.

Seeds

Draw

Draw

References

External links
 Draw

2019 Women's Doubles
Kremlin Cup – Doubles
2019 in Russian women's sport